Chief Joseph Mountain is a  mountain summit located in Wallowa County, Oregon, US.

Description

Chief Joseph Mountain is located five miles south of Joseph, Oregon, in the Wallowa Mountains. It is set within the Eagle Cap Wilderness on land managed by Wallowa–Whitman National Forest. The peak ranks as the 14th-highest summit in Oregon, and the 8th-highest of the Wallowa Mountains. The peak is situated southwest of Wallowa Lake and precipitation runoff from the mountain drains into tributaries of the Wallowa River. The bulk of the mountain is a complex geology of Mesozoic granodiorite of the Wallowa Batholith, limestone, greenstone and a small relict summit cap composed of Columbia River basalt.

Etymology

This landform's toponym was officially adopted in 1925 by the United States Board on Geographic Names to honor Chief Joseph (1840–1904), leader of the Wal-lam-wat-kain (Wallowa) band of Nez Perce tribe. Chief Joseph led his band of Nez Perce during the most tumultuous period in their history, when they were forcibly removed by the United States federal government from their ancestral lands in the Wallowa Valley. Ironically, Mount Howard which is immediately across the Wallowa Valley from Chief Joseph Mountain is named after Oliver Otis Howard, the Army officer responsible for evicting Chief Joseph in 1877. "Point Joseph" is an alternate official name for the summit and "Tunnel Mountain" has also been used in the past. The nearby town of Joseph is also named after him.

Climate

Based on the Köppen climate classification, Chief Joseph Mountain is located in a subarctic climate zone characterized by long, usually very cold winters, and mild summers. Winter temperatures can drop below −10 °F with wind chill factors below −20 °F. Most precipitation in the area is caused by orographic lift.

Gallery

See also
 List of mountain peaks of Oregon

References

External links

 Weather forecast: Chief Joseph Mountain
 Basalt summit cap (photo): Peakbagger.com

Mountains of Oregon
Mountains of Wallowa County, Oregon
North American 2000 m summits
Wallowa–Whitman National Forest